Kalampunian Damit Island also known as Snake Island is an island located in the West Coast of Sabah, Malaysia. This island is part of the Tiga Island National Park along with the Kalampunian Besar Island and Tiga Island.

See also
 List of islands of Malaysia

References 

Islands of Sabah